The 6th Washington D.C. Area Film Critics Association Awards, honouring the best in filmmaking in 2007, were given on December 10, 2007.

Winners
 Best Actor
 George Clooney – Michael Clayton
 Best Actress
 Julie Christie – Away from Her
 Best Animated Feature
 Ratatouille
 Best Art Direction
 Sweeney Todd: The Demon Barber of Fleet Street
 Best Breakthrough Performance
 Elliot Page – Juno
 Best Cast
 No Country for Old Men
 Best Director
 Joel Coen and Ethan Coen – No Country for Old Men
 Best Documentary Feature
 Sicko
 Best Film
 No Country for Old Men
 Best Foreign Language Film
 Le scaphandre et le papillon (The Diving Bell and the Butterfly), France/United States
 Best Screenplay – Adapted
 Charlie Wilson's War – Aaron Sorkin Best Screenplay – Original Juno – Diablo Cody Best Supporting Actor Javier Bardem – No Country for Old Men
 Best Supporting Actress
 Amy Ryan – Gone Baby Gone and Before the Devil Knows You're Dead

Notes

References

External links
 The Washington D.C. Area Film Critics Association

2007 film awards
2007